Lookout Mountain, elevation , is the second highest peak in Oregon's Mount Hood National Forest and the highest point in Badger Creek Wilderness.

From its summit and with good visibility, one may see (from approximately west and moving clockwise) Mount Hood, Mount St. Helens, Mount Rainier, Mount Adams, Broken Top, South Sister, North Sister, Mount Washington, and Mount Jefferson with the unassisted eye.

In 1911 a Forest Service lookout was built on the summit and was replaced by an L-4 tower in 1940. The site was abandoned in 1966 and the structure was later removed.

References

External links
 

Columbia River Gorge
Landforms of Hood River County, Oregon
Mount Hood
Mount Hood National Forest
Mountains of Oregon